The Communauté de communes du Pays de Bière is a former federation of municipalities (communauté de communes) in the Seine-et-Marne département and in the Île-de-France région of France. It was created in November 2001. It was dissolved in January 2017, when most of its communes joined the new Communauté d'agglomération du Pays de Fontainebleau.

Composition 
The Communauté de communes comprised the following communes:

Arbonne-la-Forêt
Barbizon
Cély
Chailly-en-Bière
Fleury-en-Bière
Perthes
Saint-Germain-sur-École
Saint-Martin-en-Bière
Saint-Sauveur-sur-École
Villiers-en-Bière

See also
Communes of the Seine-et-Marne department

References

Former commune communities of Seine-et-Marne